The seventh season of the talent show The Voice of Greece premiered on September 13, 2020, on Skai TV and Sigma TV, for the fifth time. Host Giorgos Lianos, as well as the four coaches from the previous season, Helena Paparizou, Sakis Rouvas, Panos Mouzourakis and Eleonora Zouganeli all returned. After one season hiatus, Laura Narjes returned as the backstage host, replacing Christina Bompa. Doukissa Nomikou hosted only the live shows, because Lianos was in Dominican Republic, where he was hosting the eighth season of Survivor Greece.

Ioanna Georgakopoulou was named the winner of the season on February 12, 2021; marking Helena Paparizou's first win as a coach on The Voice of Greece.

Teams
Color key

Blind auditions
The blind auditions began airing on September 13, 2020, and ended on November 22, 2020, being broadcast every Sunday on Skai TV and Sigma TV.

Color key

Episode 1 (September 13) 
The first blind audition episode was broadcast on September 13, 2020.

Episode 2 (September 20) 
The second blind audition episode was broadcast on September 20, 2020.

Episode 3 (September 27) 
The third blind audition episode was broadcast on September 27, 2020.

Episode 4 (October 4) 
The fourth blind audition episode was broadcast on October 4, 2020.

Episode 5 (October 11) 
The fifth blind audition episode was broadcast on October 11, 2020.

Episode 6 (October 18) 
The sixth blind audition episode was broadcast on October 18, 2020.

Episode 7 (October 25) 
The seventh blind audition episode was broadcast on October 25, 2020.

Episode 8 (November 1) 
The eighth blind audition episode was broadcast on November 1, 2020.

Episode 9 (November 8) 
The ninth blind audition episode was broadcast on November 8, 2020.

Episode 10 (November 15) 
The tenth blind audition episode was broadcast on November 15, 2020.

Episode 11 (November 22) 
The eleventh blind audition episode was broadcast on November 22, 2020.

Episode 12 (November 29) 
The twelfth and final blind audition episode was broadcast on November 29, 2020.

Knockouts
The Knockouts began airing on December 6, 2020, and ended on January 8, 2021. The coaches can each steal two losing artist from another team. Contestants who win their knockout or are stolen by another coach will advance to the Battles. This season the coaches had advisors: Yannis Zouganelis for team Eleonora Zouganeli, Dimitris Starovas for team Panos Mouzourakis, Tamta for team Helena Paparizou and Stelios Rokkos for team Sakis Rouvas.

Colour key

Battles
The Battles started on January 15, 2021, and ended on January 22, 2021. The coaches can each steal one losing artist from another team. Contestants who win their battle or are stolen by another coach will advance to the Live Shows. After announcing Konstantina Vlasi's withdrawal from the competition, Panos Mouzourakis grouped three of his team members into one battle, in which two contestants from the trio advanced, with the third eliminated.

Colour key

Live shows
The live shows began airing on January 28, 2021. Like in the previous seasons, in the first week were the cross battles, then was the semi final, but this season was only for one live and the last stage was the final. It was announced that Antonia Kaouri will not be participating in the live shows for personal reasons and will be replaced by Nadia Iarajouli.
Color key

Week 1: Cross Battles (January 28 & 29)

Week 2: Semi Final (February 5)

Week 3: Final (February 12)

Ratings 

Note

  Outside top 20.

References

External links
 

Season 7
Voice of Greece 2020
Voice of Greece 2021